San Isidro is a district of the Alajuela canton, in the Alajuela province of Costa Rica.

Geography 
San Isidro has an area of  km² and an elevation of  metres.

Demographics 

For the 2011 census, San Isidro had a population of  inhabitants.

Transportation

Road transportation 
The district is covered by the following road routes:
 National Route 126
 National Route 130
 National Route 712
 National Route 718
 National Route 719
 National Route 727

References 

Districts of Alajuela Province
Populated places in Alajuela Province